Vardan Ayvazyan (born 7 November 1961) is the current Ecology Minister of Armenia.

References

Government ministers of Armenia
1961 births
Living people